Demir Peco (born 31 July 1996) is a Bosnian professional footballer who plays as a right winger for Bosnian Premier League club FK Sloga Meridian.

International career
He also played for the Bosnia and Herzegovina U21 national team, making six appearances for the team but did not score a goal.

Honours
Radnik Bijeljina 
Republika Srpska Cup: 2016–17, 2017–18, 2018–19

Velež Mostar
Bosnian Cup: 2021–22

References

External links

1996 births
Living people
People from Monthey
Swiss people of Bosnia and Herzegovina descent
Citizens of Bosnia and Herzegovina through descent
Association football wingers
Swiss men's footballers
Bosnia and Herzegovina footballers
Bosnia and Herzegovina under-21 international footballers
FK Velež Mostar players
FK Radnik Bijeljina players
NK Varaždin players
Premier League of Bosnia and Herzegovina players
Croatian Football League players
Bosnia and Herzegovina expatriate footballers
Expatriate footballers in Croatia
Bosnia and Herzegovina expatriate sportspeople in Croatia
Sportspeople from Valais